The posterior cutaneous nerve of arm (internal cutaneous branch of musculospiral, posterior brachial cutaneous nerve) is a branch of the radial nerve that provides sensory innervation for much of the skin on the back of the arm.  It arises in the axilla.

It is of small size, and passes through the axilla to the medial side of the area supplying the skin on its dorsal surface nearly as far as the olecranon.

In its course it crosses behind and communicates with the intercostobrachial.

See also
 Superior lateral cutaneous nerve of arm
 Inferior lateral cutaneous nerve of arm
 Medial cutaneous nerve of arm
 Posterior cutaneous nerve of forearm

Additional images

References

External links
 
 

Nerves of the upper limb